The following is a partial list of valleys in India, listed alphabetically. Many of these valleys in India are named after the river that flows through them.

  
 

 
Valleys
India